The  is a German foundation that owns a majority shareholding in Robert Bosch GmbH, from which it derives its funding. The foundation was established in accordance with the wishes of Robert Bosch, who died in 1942, and conducts and finances social, cultural and scientific projects.

History 

In 1921, when Robert Bosch drew up his will, he established the Vermögensverwaltung Bosch GmbH, with instructions to the directors to decide within thirty years of his death whether or not his shares in Robert Bosch GmbH should be transferred into it. Bosch died in 1942, and this transfer took place in 1964. In 1969 the name was changed from Vermögensverwaltung Bosch to Robert Bosch Stiftung.

In 2007 the holding of the Stiftung in Robert Bosch GmbH was approximately 92% of the issued stock. The work of the foundation is financed by income from it.

Work 

The foundation both conducts and finances social, cultural and scientific projects, in accordance with the wishes of Robert Bosch. In an average year, some eight hundred projects are active, in fields including natural and social sciences, public health, education, and cultural and international relations.

The Institut für Geschichte der Medizin (Institute for the History of Medicine) is the archive of the foundation.

The Stiftung has four subsidiary foundations: the Hans-Walz-Stiftung, which funds naturopathic treatment; the Otto und Edith Mühlschlegel-Stiftung, for projects related to aging; the DVA-Stiftung, for Franco-German cultural relations; and the Rochus und Beatrice Mummert Stiftung, which provides study grants to students from Eastern Europe.

In 2014, the Robert Bosch Stiftung established the Berlin-based Robert Bosch Academy, a multidisciplinary institution that invites distinguished public intellectuals and thinkers from across the world to be Richard von Weizsäcker Fellows in Berlin.

From 1964 to 2017, the foundation provided 1.6 billion euros in funding. In 2017, it issued grants worth 100.5 million euros.

The foundation is involved in work to modernise the German healthcare system. In particular it is trying to develop more small health centers.

Each year, the Robert Bosch Stiftung issues three Co-Production Prizes for joint film productions by young German filmmakers and their partners from the Arab countries. Until 2015 the Prize was awarded to filmmakers from Germany and Eastern Europe.

Between 1985 to March 2017, the Robert Bosch Stiftung administered the Adelbert von Chamisso Prize, a literary prize for "authors writing in the German language whose literature is affected by cultural changes."

It is a member of the Network of European Foundations for Innovative Cooperation (NEF) and Philea - Philanthropy Europe Association.

References

External links 
 Robert Bosch Stiftung GmbH
 Robert Bosch GmbH

Foundations based in Germany
1964 establishments in Germany